Doug O'Brien (born February 16, 1984) is a Canadian former professional ice hockey defenceman who played five games in the National Hockey League with the Tampa Bay Lightning.

Playing career
O'Brien was drafted 192nd overall in the 6th round of the 2003 NHL Entry Draft by the Lightning. O'Brien played four seasons of major junior hockey for the Hull/Gatineau Olympiques of the Quebec Major Junior Hockey League (QMJHL) before turning professional.  In the 2003–04 season with the Olympiques, Doug recorded 63 points in 66 games and was named the league's top defenceman.

O'Brien made his professional debut with the Lightning's affiliate, the Springfield Falcons of the AHL in the 2004–05 season. At the end of the 2005–06 season, O'Brien made his NHL debut with the Lightning, featuring in 5 games.

Unable to secure a place with the Lightning for the 2006–07 season, O'Brien was assigned to the Falcons. On February 27, 2007, O'Brien was traded by the Lightning to the Anaheim Ducks for Joe Rullier he was then sent to affiliate, the Portland Pirates, for the duration of the season.

A free agent upon the 2007–08 season, O'Brien signed with Finnish team Lukko Rauma of the SM-liiga. Doug returned to North America when he signed with the Rochester Americans of the AHL on September 5, 2008. After playing in 12 games with the Amerks in the 2008–09 season, Doug was demoted to affiliate, the Florida Everblades of the ECHL on November 11, 2009.

O'Brien signed with Czech Republic team, Plzeň of the Czech Extraliga for the 2009–10 season.  He joined Sparta Praha the following season before leaving professional hockey in 2011.

Career statistics

Awards
QMJHL

CHL

References

External links

1984 births
Living people
Canadian ice hockey defencemen
Florida Everblades players
Gatineau Olympiques players
HC Plzeň players
HC Sparta Praha players
Hull Olympiques players
Ice hockey people from Newfoundland and Labrador
Johnstown Chiefs players
Lukko players
Portland Pirates players
Rochester Americans players
Sportspeople from St. John's, Newfoundland and Labrador
Springfield Falcons players
Tampa Bay Lightning draft picks
Tampa Bay Lightning players
Canadian expatriate ice hockey players in the Czech Republic
Canadian expatriate ice hockey players in Finland
Canadian expatriate ice hockey players in the United States